Tan Hill may refer to:

 Tan Hill, North Yorkshire, England
 Tan Hill, Wiltshire, England

See also
Tan Hills